The Porowakara were a minority community of wood cutters from Sri Lanka. They were a part of the feudal land tenure system of Sri Lanka but eventually became absorbed into larger communities. 

This community was classed as a sub-caste of the Govigama during the British period.

See also 
 Caste system in Sri Lanka

References 
 Ryan Bryce 1953 Caste in Modern Ceylon, Rutgers University Press
 Ceylon Gazetteer 1855

Sinhalese castes